WYKZ (98.7 FM) is an adult contemporary radio station owned by iHeartMedia, Inc. and licensed to Beaufort, South Carolina, with the branding "98.7 The River - The Best Variety Of Yesterday & Today!" The station's studio is located on Alfred St. in Savannah, Georgia, and the transmitter is located near Sun City, South Carolina.

History
The station began broadcasting in the early 1960s as a station primarily for Beaufort County, WBEU-FM. 98.7 upgraded its tower in the early '80s and began targeting Savannah as adult contemporary WQLO "98.7 Lite FM". The station was known as "Kiss 98.7" for most of the 1980s before adopting its current name in the early 1990s.

External links
98.7 The River

YKZ
Mainstream adult contemporary radio stations in the United States
IHeartMedia radio stations
Radio stations established in 1962
1962 establishments in South Carolina